Toome is a surname in Estonia, and may refer to:

Indrek Toome (born 1943), Soviet Estonian politician
Joosep Toome (born 1985), Estonian basketball player
Koit Toome (born 1979), Estonian singer
Mart Toome (born 1980), Estonian actor

See also 

 Toom (surname)
 Tohme (surname)

Estonian-language surnames